Lok Singh was an Indian cinematographer who primarily worked in Telugu movies mostly in the 80s and 90s. He worked for over 31 movies with Chiranjeevi.
He died in an accident, caused by a fire, on the sets of Big Boss, in 1995.

Selected filmography

References

Cinematographers from Andhra Pradesh
Telugu film cinematographers
Year of birth missing